Hennie Aucamp (20 January 1934 – 20 March 2014) was a South African Afrikaans poet, short story writer, cabaretist and academic. He grew up on a farm in the Stormberg highlands and matriculated at Jamestown, Eastern Cape before continuing his higher education at the University of Stellenbosch. He died in Cape Town at age 80 on 20 March 2014 after suffering a stroke.

Works

Short stories
 Een somermiddag  (1963)
 Die hartseerwals: verhale en sketse (1965)
 Spitsuur (1967)
 ’n Bruidsbed vir Tant Nonnie (1970)
 Hongerblom: vyf elegieë (1972)
 Wolwedans: ’n sort revue (1973)
 Dooierus (1976)
 Enkelvlug (1978)
 Volmink (1981)
 Vir vier stemme (1981) (Limited Edition of 25 copies)
 Wat bly oor van soene? (1986)
 Dalk gaan niks verlore nie en ander tekste (1992)
 Gewis is alles net ’n grap en ander stories (1994)
 Ook skaduwees laat spore (2000)
 'n Vreemdeling op deurtog (2007)
 Die huis van die digter (2009)
 Proses (2009)

Poetry
 Die lewe is ’n grenshotel: ryme vir pop en kabaret (1977)
 Die blou uur: 50 cocktail-kwatryne (1984)
 Rampe in die ruigte: fabels vir almal (1996)
 Koerier: 69 opdrag- en ander kwatryne (1999)
 Lyflied: ’n keur uit sy liedtekste (1999)
 Hittegolf: wulpse sonnette met ’n nawoord (2002)
 Dryfhout: 40 verse (2005)
 Vlamsalmander (2008)
 Skulp: kwatryne (2014)

Cabaret texts and plays
 Papawerwyn en ander verbeeldings vir die verhoog (1980)
 Met permissie gesê: ’n kabaret (1980)
 Slegs vir almal: ’n kabaret oor selfsug (1986)
 By Felix en Madame en ander eenbedrywe (1987)
 Teen latenstyd: verdere lirieke 1980-1986 (1987)
 Sjampanje vir ontbyt: drie verwante eenbedrywe (1988)
 Punt in die wind: ’n komedie met drie bedrywe en ’n nadraai (1989)
 Brommer in die boord (1990)
 Dubbeldop: kabarettekste en –opstelle (1994)

Criticism
 Kort voor lank: opstelle oor kortprosatekste (1978)
 Woorde wat wond: geleentheidstukke oor randkultuur (1984)
 Die blote storie: ’n werkboek vir kortverhaalskrywers (1986)
 Dagblad (1987)
 Die blote storie 2: ’n werkboek vir kortverhaalskrywers (1994)
 Windperd: opstelle oor kreatiewe skryf (1992)
 Beeltenis verbode: bespiegelinge oor egodokumente en biografieë (1998)

Travel writing
 Karnaatjie: reissketse en essays (1968)
 In lande ver vandaan: China – Tibet – Nepal: ’n toerjoernaal (2001)

Diaries
 Gekaapte tyd: ’n kladboek September 1994 – Maart 1995 (1996)
 Allersiele: ’n dagboek Mei 1995 – Februarie 1996 (1997)
 Skuinslig: ’n dagboek Maart 1996 – April 1997) (2003)
 In die vroegte: herinneringe en refleksies (2003)

Selections from own work
 In een kraal: ’n keuse uit die prosa van Hennie Aucamp (1978)
 Brandglas: ’n keuse uit sy verhale (1987)

Compilations
 ’n Baksel in die more: boerestories uit die Stormberge (1973)
 Hoorspelkeur; radiodramas deur Hennie Aucamp et al. (1983)
 Van hoogmoed tot traagheid, of, Die sewe doodsondes (1996)

Commemorative
 M.E.R. 100 (1975)
 ’n Boekreis ver (1991)
 Bly te kenne: ’n bundel portrette (2001)
 ’n Skrywer by sonsopkoms: Hennie Aucamp 70 (compiled by Lina Spies and Lucas Malan).

In translation
 House visits: a collection of short stories; translated by Ian Ferguson (2005)
 Brecht sing Afrikaans (1983) (with Arnold Blumer & ander)

Wit
 Kommerkrale: ’n AB-jap vir akoliete (1983)
 Pluk die dag: aforismes en ander puntighede (1994)

Awards
1970 – Tafelbergprys
1974 – W.A. Hofmeyrprys
1980 – ATKV-prys vir Drama
1996 – Recht Malan Prize
1982 – Hertzogprys
1987 – Fleur du Cap-toneelprys
2004 – ATKV-Prestigetoekenning
2004 – Fleur du Cap-teaterprys vir lewenswerk en bydrae tot teater
2004 – Afrikaans Onbeperk Kanna vir Lewensbydrae
2004 – LitNet se Mont du Toit Kelder-wyngedigtekompetisie
2006 – Gustav Preller-prys vir Literatuurwetenskap

References

External links
 Profile, Sanlam ATKV LitNet Afrikaanse album; accessed 23 March 2014.
 HE Bates en die derde stroom, LitNet.co.za; accessed 23 March 2014.
 Muses van die modder: die tango en die kabaret, letterkunde.up.ac.za; accessed 23 March 2014.
 La Vita, Murray: Onder vier oë: Stories spring steeds uit daai onreëlmatige laaie ..., news24.com; accessed 23 March 2014.
 Stellenbosch Writers profiles, stellenboschwriters.com; accessed 23 March 2014.

1934 births
People from Dordrecht, Eastern Cape
Afrikaner people
Afrikaans-language writers
Sestigers
Afrikaans-language poets
Stellenbosch University alumni
Academic staff of Stellenbosch University
Hertzog Prize winners for prose
South African LGBT poets
2014 deaths
20th-century South African poets